Greg Zuerlein (born October 26, 1988) is an American former ice dancer. With Madison Chock, he is the 2009 World Junior champion, 2008 JGP Final champion, and 2011 U.S. national bronze medalist. They competed together from 2006 to 2011.

Personal life
Zuerlein was born in Cincinnati, Ohio. He enrolled in Schoolcraft College. His older sister competed in synchronized skating at Junior Synchro Worlds. In March 2014, Zuerlein married Philippe Maitrot, who is originally from France.

Career

Competitive Career 
Zuerlein began skating at the age of four. He competed in single skating at the 2002 and 2003 U.S. junior championships on the juvenile level. He then took up ice dancing. Zuerlein skated with Anastasia Olsen from 2002 through 2006. They won the bronze medal in intermediate dance in 2005 and placed 12th at the novice level at the 2006 U.S. Championships.

Zuerlein teamed up with Madison Chock in June 2006. They placed 5th in the novice division at the 2007 U.S. Championships. They began working with Igor Shpilband and Marina Zueva in 2007. Chock/Zuerlein were assigned to the 2007–08 ISU Junior Grand Prix event in Tallinn, Estonia, which they won. They won the bronze medal at their second event, qualifying them for the ISU Junior Grand Prix Final, where they placed 5th.

During the 2008–09 season, Chock/Zuerlein won gold at the Junior Grand Prix Final and at the U.S. Junior Championships. They capped off the season by becoming World Junior champions.

In the 2009–10 season, Chock/Zuerlein made their senior Grand Prix debut, finishing 6th and 8th at 2009 Skate America and 2009 Cup of China respectively. They placed 5th in their senior national debut.

Chock/Zuerlein won their first senior Grand Prix medal, bronze, at 2010 Skate Canada International. They won a second bronze medal at 2010 Trophée Éric Bompard. They won their first senior national medal, bronze, at the 2011 U.S. Championships. They made the team to the Four Continents where they finished 5th. They finished 9th in their first and only appearance at the World Championships, setting personal best scores in both segments of the competition.

On June 7, 2011, Chock and Zuerlein announced the end of their five-year partnership, with Zuerlein retiring from competition.

Coaching Career 
After retiring, Zuerlein worked as an assistant coach to Igor Shpilband for many years. In 2022, Zuerlein opened the Michigan Ice Dance Academy with Charlie White and Tanith Belbin White.
Their current teams include:

 Emily Bratti / Ian Somerville
 Molly Cesanek / Yehor Yehorov
 Caroline Green / Michael Parsons

Their former teams include:

 Katarina Wolfkostin / Jeffrey Chen

Programs 
(with Chock)

Competitive highlights 
GP: Grand Prix; JGP: Junior Grand Prix

With Chock

With Olson

References

External links 

 
 Anastasia Olsen / Greg Zuerlein at Tracings.net

American male ice dancers
1988 births
Living people
Schoolcraft College alumni
Sportspeople from Cincinnati
World Junior Figure Skating Championships medalists
Gay sportsmen
LGBT figure skaters
LGBT people from Ohio
American LGBT sportspeople
Gay dancers